The Anarchist Prince is a biography of Peter Kropotkin by George Woodcock and Ivan Avakumović.

Publication 

Avakumović co-authored the book as a student.

The book was republished in 1990 by Black Rose Books as Peter Kropotkin: From Prince to Rebel.

Legacy 

The Anarchist Prince was followed a quarter-century later by Martin A. Miller's Kropotkin, which was more scholarly and critical, by comparison,  with a fuller bibliography.

References

Further reading

External links 

 

1950 non-fiction books
Biographies about anarchists
Books about Peter Kropotkin
Books by George Woodcock
English-language books